Auen may refer to:

Auen, Germany, Bad Kreuznach district, Rhineland-Palatinate
 a community in Wolfsberg, Carinthia, Austria
ǂKxʼaoǁʼae or Auen, a southern African Khoisan language